Swans Way were a three-piece English pop group. In addition to the future Scarlet Fantastic duo of Maggie De Monde (vocals and percussion) and Rick P. Jones (double bass), Swans Way featured the vocals of Robert Shaw.

Formed in Birmingham in 1982, Swans Way presented a mixture of musical influences, from jazz to classical and pop to disco. Their first single, "Theme from the Balcony" issued in 1982, was not a chart hit, but their second, "Soul Train", reached number 20 in the UK Singles Chart in February 1984.

They also released further singles, with varying success. "The Anchor", in March 1984, did not chart, whilst "Illuminations" made number 57 in May 1984, and their third and final hit, "When The Wild Calls", peaked outside the Top 75 (the officially-published chart listing) at number 80. The group recorded an album, The Fugitive Kind, which made number 88 on the UK Albums Chart in November 1984.

The album was issued on CD, but only about 100 copies were pressed. It was re-released on CD in 1997 with extra tracks as The Best of Swans Way and again in 2012 with a different set of bonus tracks under the title of The Fugitive Kind - Expanded Edition.

The band split up in 1985 due to musical differences. De Monde is one half of the recording duo Maggie & Martin, while Shaw has released albums with his band Mighty Math.

Discography

Albums
 The Fugitive Kind (Balgier Records) (1984) - UK No. 88
 The Best Of (Universal Records) (1998)
 The Fugitive Kind - Expanded Edition (Cherry Pop) (2012)

Singles
 "Theme from the Balcony" (1982)
 "Soul Train" (Exit Records) (1984) - UK No. 20
 "The Anchor" (Exit Records) (1984)
 "Illuminations" (Balgier Records) (1984) - UK No. 57
 "When the Wild Calls" (Balgier Records) (1984) - UK No. 80

Videos
  Swans Way History and Image (VHS, 50 mins)

References

External links
Mini biography of Swans Way at Scarlet-fantastic.co.uk

British pop music groups
English new wave musical groups
Musical groups established in 1982
Musical groups disestablished in 1984
1982 establishments in the United Kingdom